Glenn Gossett (April 23, 1928 – October 6, 1995) was an American football player and coach. He served as the head football coach at Northwestern State University in Natchitoches, Louisiana from 1967 to 1971, compiling a record of 31–14–1.

Head coaching record

College football

References

1928 births
1995 deaths
Arkansas State Red Wolves football coaches
Eastern Kentucky Colonels football coaches
Louisiana–Monroe Warhawks baseball players
Louisiana–Monroe Warhawks football players
Louisiana–Monroe Warhawks men's basketball players
Northwestern State Demons and Lady Demons athletic directors
Northwestern State Demons football coaches
SMU Mustangs football coaches
College track and field coaches in the United States
High school football coaches in Louisiana
People from Garland County, Arkansas
People from Malvern, Arkansas
Players of American football from Arkansas
Baseball players from Arkansas
Basketball players from Arkansas
American men's basketball players